The Journal of Ethics is a philosophical academic journal focusing on ethics. Its editor-in-chief is J. Angelo Corlett.

The journal was established in 1997 and is published by Springer Netherlands. Notable contributors are Richard Arneson, Simon Blackburn, G. A. Cohen, Ronald Dworkin, John Martin Fischer, Harry Frankfurt, Margaret Gilbert, Robert E. Goodin, Gilbert Harman, Ted Honderich, Shelly Kagan, Frances Kamm, Christine Korsgaard, Michael McKenna, Jeff McMahan, Martha Nussbaum, Thomas Pogge, Henry S. Richardson, Peter Singer, Peter Vallentyne, Peter van Inwagen, Jeremy Waldron, and Jonathan Wolff.

External links

Springer Science+Business Media academic journals
English-language journals
Quarterly journals
Publications established in 1997
Ethics journals